Jungle Fever is a 1991 film directed by Spike Lee.

Jungle Fever or jungle fever may also refer to:

Music
 Jungle Fever (soundtrack), a 1991 soundtrack album by Stevie Wonder
 Jungle Fever (album), an album by the Chakachas
 "Jungle Fever" (song), a song by the Chakachas
 Jungle Fever, an album by Blackface
 "Jungle Fever", a 1962 song by Geoff Goddard on the B-side of "Telstar"
 "Jungle Fever", a 2006 song by Pitbull featuring Wyclef Jean and Oobie from El Mariel

Other uses
 Dated term for tropical disease, especially:
 Malaria, a mosquito-borne infectious disease
 "Jungle Fever" (SMBSS episode), an episode of The Super Mario Bros. Super Show!
 Jungle Fever, an Atari 2600 video game published by Playaround